  
Leadenham is a village and civil parish in North Kesteven district of  Lincolnshire, England. The population of the civil parish at the 2011 census was 410.

History

There is evidence of Bronze Age, Romano-British and Early Medieval occupation.

The name of the village probably comes from the Anglo-Saxon 'Leodan' and 'ham' for "homestead or village of a man called Leoda." It appears in the  Domesday Book as "Ledeneham".

Much of the village belonged to the Reeve family whose family seat is still Leadenham House, a Georgian country house built from 1790 for William Reeve.

The Royal Flying Corps airfield to the east was built in 1916, and closed in 1919.

The village boasted a railway station from 1876 to 1965 which was part of the Grantham and Lincoln Railway Line.

In 1995 the village was bypassed to the south by the A17.

Community

Leadenham Anglican church is dedicated to St Swithun; it originated in the 13th century and is in Decorated style.

The ecclesiastical parish is part of the Loveden Deanery of the Diocese of Lincoln. As of 2016, the incumbent is Rev Alison Healy.

The Village Post Office is in the heart of Leadenham on Main Road. In 2015, Leadenham Teahouse opened within the Post Office. In March 2017, the Post Office and Leadenham Teahouse won a Rural Oscar with the Countryside Alliance awards for the Best Post Office and Village Shop in the East of England.

The village public house is the George Hotel on High Street (A607).

References

External links

Leadenham Teahouse
 Primary school
 Leadenham Players
 Leadenham Polo Club
 Leadenham House
 "Leadenham", Genuki

Villages in Lincolnshire
Civil parishes in Lincolnshire
North Kesteven District